Harsault is a former commune in the Vosges department in Grand Est in northeastern France. On 1 January 2017, it was merged into the new commune La Vôge-les-Bains.

Geography
The Côney formed most of the commune's eastern border.

See also
Communes of the Vosges department

References

Former communes of Vosges (department)